Epinotia abnormana is a species of moth of the family Tortricidae. It is found in China (Shanxi, Gansu).

References

Moths described in 1973
Eucosmini